Rock the Block is the fourteenth studio album by the Swiss hard rock band Krokus, released in 2003. The album peaked at No. 1 in the Swiss Album Chart and was certified Gold in Switzerland.

Track listing
All songs by Fernando von Arb and Marc Storace, except where indicated

"Mad World" - 3:56 
"Leading the Pack" - 3:34 
"I Want It All" (Tony Castell, von Arb, Storace) - 4:08 
"Open Fire" - 5:09
"One for All" - 3:36
"Looking to America" - 4:10
"Go My Way" - 4:14 
"Hot Shot" (Castell, von Arb, Storace) - 3:34 
"Raise Your Hands" - 3:53 
"Night of the Snakes" - 3:32 
"Throwing Her China" - 4:11 
"We'll Rise" - 4:56 
"Freedom" (Charles Stettler, von Arb, Storace) - 3:52 
"Rock the Block" - 2:25

Personnel
Band members
Marc Storace - vocals, producer
Fernando von Arb – guitars, bass, keyboards, producer
Dominique Favez – guitars, producer, engineer, mixing
Tony Castell – bass, guitars
Patrick Aeby - drums, percussion, producer, engineer, mixing

Additional musicians
Mark Edward - backing vocals

Production
George Marino - mastering at Sterling Sound, New York

Charts

Certifications

References

Krokus (band) albums
2003 albums
Warner Music Group albums